Hills of Old Wyoming is a 1937 American Western film directed by Nate Watt and written by Maurice Geraghty, the 10th film of the 66 Hopalong Cassidy movies. The film stars William Boyd, George "Gabby" Hayes, Morris Ankrum, Russell Hayden, Gail Sheridan, John Beach and Clara Kimball Young, Russell Hayden makes his first (of 27 consecutive) appearances. The film was released on April 16, 1937, by Paramount Pictures.

Plot
An evil deputy is using Indian mixed-blood individuals to rustle cattle. This causes trouble between the cattlemen and the Indians. Hoppy, Windy and Lucky see that justice is served. Songs abound.

Cast  
 William Boyd as Hopalong Cassidy
 George "Gabby" Hayes as Windy Halliday
 Morris Ankrum as Andrews 
 Russell Hayden as Lucky Jenkins
 Gail Sheridan as Alice Hutchins
 John Beach as Rancher Saunders
 Clara Kimball Young as Ma Hutchins
 Earle Hodgins as Thompson 
 Steve Clemente as Henchman Lone Eagle
 Chief John Big Tree as Chief Big Tree
 George Chesebro as Henchman Peterson 
 Paul Gustine as Henchman Daniels
 Leo J. McMahon as Cowhand Steve 
 John Powers as Smiley the Cook

References

External links 
 
 
 
 

1937 films
American Western (genre) films
1937 Western (genre) films
Paramount Pictures films
Films directed by Nate Watt
Hopalong Cassidy films
American black-and-white films
1930s English-language films
1930s American films